The Pentax K-mount, sometimes referred to as the "PK-mount", is a bayonet lens mount standard for mounting interchangeable photographic lenses to 35 mm single-lens reflex (SLR) cameras. It was created by Pentax in 1975, and has since been used by all Pentax 35 mm and digital SLRs and also the MILC Pentax K-01. A number of other manufacturers have also produced many K-mount lenses and K-mount cameras.

Mounts 

The Pentax K-mount has undergone a number of evolutions over the years as new functionality has been added. In general, the term K-mount may refer to the original K-mount, or to all its variations.

Originally designed by Zeiss for an alliance with Pentax, it was intended to be a common lens mount for a proposed series of cameras and lenses. However, the plan failed to work out and the two firms parted company amicably, but Pentax retained the lens mount and at least one Zeiss lens design for its own use.

K-mount 

The original K-mount is a simple bayonet connection with three tabs. It was introduced with the K series of cameras. The lens is locked into the camera with an approx. 70° clockwise turn (when looking at the front of the camera).

The only linkage with the camera is mechanical and involves the aperture. A slot between two of the bayonet tabs on the lens allows the stop-down coupler from the camera to sense the aperture setting on the lens and adjust the light meter display accordingly. Opposite this is the diaphragm release from the lens which extends into the camera body and holds open the spring-loaded diaphragm of the lens. When setting up a shot this keeps the diaphragm fully open. When the shutter is released, so is this lever. It allows the diaphragm to close to the desired setting while the film is being exposed, and opens it again after the shutter closes.

Both of these linkages are arranged so that they are aligned and spring-loaded by the act of inserting the lens and turning it until it locks.

Bodies equipped with the original K-mount include the K series, the M series except the ME F, and the LX. Lenses that support it include those labelled 'SMC Pentax', 'SMC Pentax-M' and 'SMC Pentax-A'. These K-mount bodies cannot use lenses that lack an aperture ring, such as FAJ or DA.

K-mount lenses can be used on all Pentax bodies, but are restricted to stopped down mode when used with "crippled" KAF-mount bodies (see below).

KF-mount 

The KF-mount was Pentax's first attempt at an autofocus system. This autofocus system used sensors in the camera body and a motor in the lens. The two were connected via five new electrical contacts on the bayonet mount itself. One permitted the lens to turn on the camera's metering and focus sensors, two focused the lens (towards and away from infinity) and two appear to have been unused and may have been reserved for future functionality.

The KF-mount was largely a failure. Only one camera and one lens ever used this mount, the Pentax ME F and SMC Pentax-AF 35-70/2.8. The lens was somewhat large and cumbersome since it had to enclose both the focusing motor (with gears) and batteries to power it. KF and the ME-F are similar in many ways to the system used by Canon in the ill-fated Canon T80, introduced several years later.

The ME F can use all Pentax K-mount lenses which feature an aperture ring. The 35–70 mm lens can be used on all other Pentax K-mount bodies in manual focus mode, but it must be used stopped down on "crippled" KAF bodies.

KA-mount 

The KA-mount is derived from the original K-mount. It allows the lens's aperture to be set by the body, and thus permits shutter priority and program auto exposure modes. It was introduced in 1983, and is supported by A-series and P-series bodies; Pentax lenses that support it are marked 'SMC Pentax-A'. It is completely backward-compatible with the original K-mount.

The aperture on the lens is set from the body by the same stop-down lever found on the original K-mount, but on KA-lenses this lever is proportional to the area of the aperture opening, rather than the diameter as on previous lenses. This allows the body to easily set a specific aperture, since the relationship to F stops is linear. The lenses add an 'A' setting on the aperture dial, which gives the body control of the aperture. Other, numeric settings are used for manual aperture modes—aperture priority and full manual mode.

Six electrical contacts are added to the bayonet ring. One is slightly recessed and allows the lens to indicate whether the aperture ring is set at 'A' or not. If it is, a pin on the lens extends slightly and makes contact, while if the lens is at any other setting the pin is retracted and does not make contact. The other five contacts are used to encode the lens's aperture range. Each contact on the lens is either conducting or non-conducting, providing a binary 1 or 0, respectively. The other three contacts encode the lens's maximum aperture; their meaning is dependent on the minimum aperture indicated by the lens. (There are at least 2 newer lenses that have a minimum aperture of only f/16: HD D FA 85mm F1.4 and HD D FA* 50mm F1.4. https://www.pentaxforums.com/lensreviews/hd-pentax-d-fa-85mm-f14-sdm-aw.html and https://www.pentaxforums.com/lensreviews/hd-pentax-d-fa-50mm-f14-sdm-aw.html)

KAF-mount 

The KAF-mount was Pentax's second and much improved attempt at adding auto-focus to lenses. It adds a small drive shaft to the KA-mount, allowing the body to adjust the focus of the lens. This makes the lenses less bulky than the earlier KF-mount, which had both a motor and batteries inside the lens.

It also adds a seventh electrical contact, this one carrying digital information from the lens to the camera. It carries the following information: focal length, distance to the subject, exact absolute f-stop value, and lens size. This information is used to make better exposure decisions, along with the multi-segmented metering that was introduced in cameras using the KAF-mount.

The MZ-30/ZX-30, MZ-50/ZX-50, MZ-60/ZX-60, the *ist series and the K100D/K110D lack the mechanical stop-down coupler/indicator. In these cameras – in aperture priority mode – the aperture is set by a dial on the camera body, and no longer on the lens. Pre-A lenses can only be used in manual stop down metering mode and manual flash mode.

KAF2-mount 

The KAF2-mount is the same as the KAF-mount except that it adds two extra power contacts to the inside of the mounting ring and transmits modulation transfer function (MTF) data through the digital seventh contact. The power contacts were originally used for power zooming. Since the introduction of the K10D digital SLR model, they are mainly used for powering Silent Drive Motor and DC motor lenses.

The K10D/K100D Super and later cameras do not have a mechanical stop-down coupler/indicator and thus can only use stop-down metering on pre-A lenses.

KA2-mount 

The KA2 is identical to KAF, but lacks the autofocus drive shaft. Another way of looking at it is that it adds the seventh contact for digital information to the KA-mount.

KAF3-mount 
The KAF3-mount is used on Pentax lenses that solely rely on SDM or DC autofocus motors. It is identical to the KAF2, but lacks the screw-drive autofocus drive shaft. Another way of looking at it is that it adds the power zoom/in-lens autofocus motor contacts to the KA2 mount.

KAF4-mount 
The KAF4-mount was introduced in June 2016 with the HD Pentax-DA 55-300mm F4.5-6.3 ED PLM WR RE lens. It is identical with KAF3, apart from the missing aperture control lever. Instead, aperture control information is transmitted digitally through the data pin and the aperture is stopped down through a motor built into the lens. It also introduced a new type of autofocus motor, designated PLM or Pulse Motor. At the time of its introduction, the following Pentax DSLR bodies were compatible with the new mount: K-70, K-50, K-S2, K-S1, K-1, K-3 II, with all but the K-70 requiring a firmware update. Also after a recent firmware update the original K3 can use the new mount.

“Partially fully-enabled” K-mount 
All digital K-mount Pentax SLR bodies as well as some lower-end film cameras lack the ability to read the position of the aperture simulator. This means that lenses that lack the lens information contacts introduced with the KA-mount (Pentax K- and M-series lenses as well as some third-party products) do not support open-aperture metering on these bodies. Instead, stop-down metering must be carried out by pushing the “green button” on the camera before taking a shot. This variation of the mount is commonly referred to as the “Partially fully-enabled“ K-mount.

R-K-mount 

The R-K-mount is a variation on the original K-mount by Ricoh. It supports Ricoh's own implementation of shutter priority and auto exposure modes, similar to the KA-mount but much simpler. The only addition to the original K-mount is a small pin, commonly dubbed Ricoh pin, at the bottom which tells the body when the aperture ring has been set to the "P" setting (similar to the "A" setting on Pentax KA lenses). The 'P' setting is not compatible with the 'A' setting as the 'P' pin is in a different location than the 'A' contact on Pentax 'A' lenses and the flange on Pentax bodies.

The R-K-mount is used on Rikenon P lenses, Ricoh bodies that include the letter 'P' in their model number, and some non-Ricoh lenses. It is compatible with all other K-mount cameras and lenses when in manual or aperture-priority exposure modes, however the extra pin needs to be removed for safe use on autofocus Pentax cameras, as it can otherwise become locked within the autofocus shaft. Lenses locked to the camera body this way are difficult to remove and may require complete dismantling.

Adaptors to use on K-mount

L39 / LTM
Adaptors can be found to allow use of lenses with Leica M39 thread (screw) mount. If a lens originally intended for Leica Rangefinder cameras is used, focusing is limited to about 10 cm. However, some SLR lenses were made in LTM 39 mount, mostly by KMZ for use in the early Zenit SLRs which had LT 39 mounts. These "Zenit" TM 39 lenses will focus properly. Or these lenses can be used in conjunction with the M42 to LTM 39 adapter.

M39
Adaptors can be found to allow use of a non-Leica 39 mm mount into the K-mount, typically as a M39-M42 adapter ring that is mounted in a M42-PK adapter; they may focus to infinity.

M42

Pentax supplies adapters to fit M42 screw-mount lenses, as do several third-party manufacturers. The M42 screw-mount system was used by Pentax prior to the introduction of the K-mount. Pentax designed the K-mount wide enough to allow an adapter to fit between the M42 thread and the K bayonet. They also kept the same flange focal distance (also called registration distance or register) as the M42 screw-mount, so that M42 lenses focus correctly using the correct adapter (such as Pentax original or Bower). There are however other third-party adapters that add to the flange focal distance so that one loses the ability to focus to infinity. The loss of infinity-focus may not be significant in macro or close-up photography.

There is great debate in the Pentax community over the applicability and safety of adapters other than those supplied by Pentax. Many users of third-party infinity-focus adapters, such as Bowers, report difficulty in removing the adapters from camera bodies. Such adapters may require modification before they may be safely used. Official Pentax adapters, and flanged non-infinity-focus adapters, do not provoke such problems.

Many old M42 lenses have a modern-day cult reputation, including the (Pentax) Asahi Takumar range. Some manufacturers, including Carl Zeiss AG, still make lenses in the M42-mount. K-mount cameras have a suitable flange focal distance (45.46 mm) to adapt old M42 lenses without any optical correction or loss of infinity focus/changed close focus distance. Other SLRs with a short flange-focal distance can accept M42 lenses as well: Canon EF-mount (44.00 mm), Sony and (Konica) Minolta A-mount (44.50 mm), Sigma (44 mm), Olympus 4/3rd (38.67 mm), and many more, but notably not Nikon F-mount (46.5 mm).

Nikon AI/AIS 
Optically corrected adapter to use Nikon AIS AI lenses on K-mount.

Voigtländer Bessamatic / Kodak Retina 
Adapter for Voigtländer Bessamatic and Voigtländer Ultramatic lenses, Kodak Retina Reflex, or Kodak Retina IIIs lenses.

Petri
There are some Petri adapters to K-mount but they do not allow to infinity focus due to the different flange distance.

Medium format
Pentax made adapters for its medium-format lenses to use on the K-mount, both the 645 and 6×7, and for the Hasselblad Bayonet type. Also there is a Pentacon-Six (Kiev88 CM) adapter still in production and a shift adapter to use Pentacon lenses as shift lens.
Pentax 645
Pentax 6×7
Hasselblad Bayonet type
Pentacon Six
Mamiya 645

T-mount 
Mounts used for Telescopes, microscopes and generic optics. The T-mount was initially developed by Tamron (1957) to allow the easy adaption of generic 35 mm SLR optics into multiple mounts. The T-mount is a 42 mm diameter 0.75 mm pitch screw mount with a 55 mm flange focal distance. Later versions (T2, T4, TX) were more advanced and complex. Several other manufacturers besides Tamron have used these mounts. Because the T-mount is still used for many telescopes and microscopes, they are still available new. Note that while both T-mount and M42-mount are 42mm screw mount systems, and will mount if they are forced, they are not compatible. The difference in pitch can cause damage to the lens, adapter or camera mount if they are confused.

Adaptall
These are adaptors designed by Tamron to allow the transfer of aperture setting from lens to camera or vice verse, including the Adapt-A-matic (1969), Adaptall (1973) and Adaptall-2 (1979). When Pentax introduced the KA-mount in 1983 Tamron upgraded their Adaptall-2 K-mount into an Adaptall-2 KA-mount. For more details see the Tamron article or the Adaptall-2 web site.

Available adaptors for other cameras to use K-mount

Four Thirds (Olympus)
Micro Four Thirds (Olympus and Panasonic)
Canon EF-mount (EOS)
Minolta/Sony A-mount (Sony Alpha)
M39 lens mount (Leica)
Samsung NX-mount
Sony E-mount (NEX)
Fujifilm X-mount

Cameras

Pentax
Manual focus
 K – K2, K2 DMD, KX, KM, K1000, K1000 SE
 K – ME, ME SE, ME Super, ME Super SE, MG, MV, MV1, MX
 K – LX
 KA – Super A, Program A/Program Plus, A3
 KA – P3, P5, P30, P30n, P30t
 KA2 – MZ-M

Auto focus
 KF – ME F
 KAF – SFX, SFXn, SF7, MZ-6, MZ-7
 KAF2 – Z-1, Z-1p, Z-5, Z-10, Z-20, Z-50, Z-70
 KAF2 – MZ-S, MZ-3, MZ-5, MZ-5n, MZ-10
 "crippled" KAF – MZ-30, MZ-50, MZ-60, *istD, *istDS(2), *istDL(2), K100D, K110D
 "crippled" KAF2 – K10D, K100D Super, K20D, K200D, K2000 (K-m), K-7, K-x, K-r, K-5, K-5 II, K-5 IIs K-01, K-30, K-3, K-3 II, K-1, K-1 II

Almaz 
 101
 102
 103
 104

Chinon 

 CE-4, CE-4s, CA-4, CA-4s, CM-4, CM-4s
 CE-5, CG-5, CM-5, CP-5, CP5s
 CP-6, CP-X
 CP-7m, CM-7
 CP-9AF

Carena 

 KSM-1

Cimko 

 ksx sears 35 mm film and a 50 mm lens

Cosina 

 C1, C1s
 CS-2, CS-3
 CT-10, CT-1A, CT-20, CT-7, CT-1G, CT-9, CT-4
 CE-4, CE-4s, CE-5

Edixa 

 CX 5

Exakta 

 HS-1
 HS-2
 HS-4
 HS-10
 HS-40
 KE 5

Lindenblatt 

 KL-2

Miranda 

 MS-1
 MS-2 Super
 MS-3

Porst 

 Compact Reflex OC
 Compact Reflex OCN

Promaster 

 Promaster 2500 PK

Quantaray 

 D2-RZ

Ricoh 

 KR-5, KR-5 Super, KR-5 Super II, KR-5 III, KR-10, KR-10 Super, KR-10M, KR-30sp
 XR-1, XR-1s, XR-2, XR-2s, XR-500, XR500 auto, XR-6, XR-7, XR-10, XR-P, XR-20sp, XR-Solar, XR-M, XR-F, XR-P, XR-S, XR-X, XR-X 3PF

Samsung 

"crippled" KAF - GX-1S, GX-1L
"crippled" KAF2 - GX-10, GX-20

Sears 

A lot of Sears cameras were made by Ricoh or Chinon and use the Pentax K-mount. Some are simply rebadged models, while others are quite different.

 KS-1000 (Ricoh XR-1)
 KS-500 (Ricoh XR-500)
 KS Auto (Ricoh XR-2S)
 KS-1
 KS-2 (Ricoh XR-7)
 KSX (Ricoh KR-10)
 KSX-P (Chinon CP-5)
 KS Super
 KS Super II

Sigma 

 SA-1

Topcon 

 RM300

Vivitar 

 V635
 V4000
 V3800N
 V3000N
 V3000s
 V2000
 XV1 (rebadged Cosina CT-1)
 XV20 (rebadged Cosina CT-20)

Cosina Voigtländer 

 Cosina Voigtländer VSL 43 (2004)

Zenit 

 Automat, 20, 21, 22, 14, photosniper FS-5
 AM, AM2, AP, 2000, APK, KM, 122K, 212K

List of lenses with any K-mount variant

Access
Access 28 mm f2.8 P-MC Macro (49 mm filter)
Access 75–300 mm f5.6 PMC Zoom (55 mm filter)

Angenieux
Angenieux a lens manufacturer in France, mainly known for its movie equipment than for photographic lenses, but it has built optics for Leica, Nikon, Canon and a few K-mount lenses.
Angenieux 70–210 mm f3.5

Agfa
The Agfa K mount cameras were rebadged Chinons.
Agfa Color 50 mm f1.4 (49 mm filter)

Arsat
Arsat is a trade mark of Ukrainian lens manufacturer Arsenal, Kiev.

PCS Arsat 35 mm f2.8 Shift Lens

Beroflex
Beroflex seems to have been a German commercial firm of photographic lenses; not too much information is available yet but it appears that it designed lenses made overseas by Japanese companies like Soligor.
Beroflex 85–210 mm f3.8
 Beroflex 500 mm f8/f22 lens, 5° view; 72 mm diameter × 42 mm. Adapter fitted for use on M42 screw thread. In 1975 came complete with lens caps and case.

Braun
Carl Braun Camera-Werk of Nuremberg, Germany, or Braun, as it was more commonly called, was founded as an optical production house. It is best known for its 35mm film cameras named Paxette, and for slide projectors named Paximat.
Braun Ultralit Zoom 28–70 mm f3.4-4.8

Carl Zeiss Jena
Carl Zeiss of East Germany marketed a number of lenses for the K-mount through its sales network. These lenses were in fact made by Sigma in Japan. The "real" 35 mm East German made Carl Zeiss Jena Lenses were available at the same time but only in Praktica B-mount.

Carl Zeiss Jena 20 mm f4 (zebra)
Carl Zeiss Jena II 24 mm f2.8
Carl Zeiss Jena 28 mm f2.8
Carl Zeiss Jena 28–70 mm f2.8-4.3 Macro Jenazoom
Carl Zeiss Jena 70–210 mm f4.5-5.6 Macro
Carl Zeiss Jena 75–300 mm f4.5-5.6 ED IF MC Macro Jenazoom
Carl Zeiss Jena 100–500 mm f5.6-8 MC Macro Jenazoom (72 mm filter)

Carl Zeiss
Carl Zeiss is one of the most prestigious names on the photographic world; it re-launched its line of lenses for the K-mount in 2008, mainly due to the growing popularity of both Pentax and Samsung digital SLRs.
Carl Zeiss announced in September 2010 that the ZK lenses would be discontinued that year. 
Carl Zeiss 18 mm f3.5 Distagon T* (June 2008)
Carl Zeiss 21 mm f2.8 Distagon T* (September 2008) (Europe Only)
Carl Zeiss 25 mm f2.8 Distagon T* ZK (2008)
Carl Zeiss 35 mm f2 Distagon T* ZK (2008)
Carl Zeiss 50 mm f1.4 Planar T* ZK (2008)
Carl Zeiss 50 mm f2 Planar T* ZK (2008)
Carl Zeiss 50 mm f2 Makro-Planar T* ZK (August 2008)
Carl Zeiss 85 mm f1.4 Planar T* ZK (2008)
Carl Zeiss 100 mm f2 Makro-Planar T* ZK

Chinon 
Chinon 24 mm f2.5
Chinon 28 mm f2.8
Chinon 35 mm f2.8 AUTO CHINON MULTI-COATED (49 mm filter)
Chinon 35–70 mm f3.3-4.5 MC Auto Focus (52 mm filter)
Chinon 35–70 mm f3.5-4.5 MC Macro (55 mm filter)
Chinon 35–80 mm f3.5-4.9 MC Macro
Chinon 35–100 mm f3.5-4.3 multicoated CLOSE FOCUS (67 mm filter)
Chinon 45 mm f2.8 Auto Multicoated
Chinon 50 mm f1.4 Auto Multicoated
Chinon 50 mm f1.7 Auto Multicoated
Chinon 50 mm f1.7 Auto Multicoated Auto Focus (58 mm filter)
Chinon 50 mm f1.9 Auto (52 mm filter)
Chinon 135 mm f2.8 Auto Multicoated
Chinon 200 mm f3.3 Auto Multicoated
Chinon Makinon 500 mm f8 catadioptric

Cima Kogaku
Cima Kogaku had a patented system that allowed them to build common lens bodies, and add the appropriate lens mount at the factory. The Pentax version was only K-mount, not KA-mount. They mostly sold their lenses on an OEM basis, with them sold under a variety of different brands. In the UK, they were sold by Photax as Super-Paragon PMC lenses. Tokyo Kogaku sold them as AM Topcor lenses for their Topcon RM300 camera. Cima Kogaku also sold them directly under the Cimko brand. (Some of the lenses below may not have ever been sold under the Cimko brand.)
Cimko MT 24 mm f2.8
Cimko MT 28 mm f2.8
Cimko MT 35 mm f2.8
AM Topcor 55 mm f1.7
Cimko MT 135 mm f2.8
Cimko MT 200 mm f3.3
Cimko MT 28–50 mm f3.5-4.5 (two touch)
Cimko MT 28–50 mm f3.5-4.5 (one touch)
Cimko MT 28–80 mm f3.5-4.5
Cimko MT 35–100 mm f3.5-4.3
Cimko MT 55–230 mm f3.5-4.5
Cimko MT 70–200 mm f3.8-4.8
Cimko MT 80–200 mm f3.8
Cimko MT 80–200 mm f4.5

Cosina
Cosina 19–35 mm f3.5-4.5 AF
Cosina 24 mm f2.8 MC macro (KA-mount)
Cosina 28 mm f2.8 macro (KA-mount)
Cosina 28–210 mm f4.2-6.5 Aspherical AF
Cosina 28–210 mm f3.5 Aspherical AF
Cosina 28 mm f2.8
Cosina 35–70 mm f3.5-4.8
Cosina 40 mm f2.5
Cosina 50 mm f1.2
Cosina 50 mm f2
Cosina 55 mm f1.2
Cosina 100 mm f3.5 AF macro
Cosina 100–300 mm f5.6 AF macro
Cosina 135 mm 1:2,8 MC

Cosmicar 
Cosmicar is a division of Pentax, it commercialized video lenses, but some were released for the K-mount.
MC Cosmicar 28 mm f2.8 (28 mm filter)
MC Cosmicar 28–80 mm f3.5-4.5 (Macro at 80 mm end; KA mount)
Cosmicar 70–200 mm f4

CPC 
CPC Lenses are also known as Phase 2 or Phase 2 CCT.
CPC 28 mm f2.8 Auto A (52 mm filter)
CPC 28-80 f2.8-4.0 (62 mm filter)
CPC 28–80 mm f3.5-4.5
CPC 28–85 mm f3.5-4.5
CPC 135 mm f2.8 MC Auto A (55 mm filter)

Eikor
 Eikor 28mm f2.8 (49mm filter)
 Eikor 80-200mm f4.5 (55mm filter)

Focal
Focal 28 mm f2.8 MC Auto (52 mm filter)
Focal 28 mm f2.8 MC Auto (55 mm filter)
Focal 135 mm f2.8 MC Auto (58 mm filter)

Gemini
Gemini 28 mm f2.8 (49 mm filter)
Gemini 1:4.5 80-200mm Macro MC Zoom 55 (55mm filter thread size).

Hanimex 
Hanimex was an Australian distributor founded by Jack Hannes after the Second World War.
 The name is a contraction of HANnes IMport and EXport and the company imported both European and Japanese lenses, bodies and accessories. Hannes apparently sought low cost providers and Hanimex lenses have a poor reputation among users.

Hanimex AUTO ZOOM f3.5-4.5
Hanimex AUTOMATIC-MC-MACRO 135 f2.8
Hanimex MC 80–200 mm f4.5

Hervic Zivnon
Hervic Zivnon 23 mm f3.5(62 mm filter)

Helios
Made for the Zenit cameras by KMZ
MC Helios 44K-4 58 mm f2 (52 mm filter)
MC Helios 77K-4 50 mm f1.8

Hoya

Hoya, a leading manufacturer of optical glass, purchased Pentax in 2008.

Hoya 24mm f2.8 HMC
Hoya 28 mm f2.8 HMC (52 mm filter)
Hoya 28–50 mm f3.5-4.5 HMC (55 mm filter)
Hoya 28–85 mm f4 HMC (72 mm filter)
Hoya 70–150 mm f3.8 HMC (55 mm filter)
Hoya 100–300 mm f5 macro HMC (62 mm filter)
Hoya 135 mm f2.8 macro HMC (52 mm filter)
Hoya 300mm f5.6 HMC
Hoya 135mm f2.8 HMC
Hoya 200mm f4.0 HMC

Irix
Irix 11 mm f/4.0 Blackstone
Irix 11 mm f/4.0 Firefly
Irix 15 mm f/2.4 Blackstone
Irix 15 mm f/2.4 Firefly

JC Penney
JC Penney 135 mm f2.8

Kalimar 
Kalimar was an American distributor of camera equipment from 1952 to 1999 when it was acquired by Tiffen.
Kalimar 28 mm f2.8 Macro (52 mm filter)
Kalimar 28–105 mm f3.5-4.5 Macro
Kalimar 35–70 mm f2.8
Kalimar 60–300 mm f4-5.6 MC AF (67 mm filter)
Kalimar 500 mm f8 (72 mm filter) (catadioptric)

Kiron 
Kiron was a third party lens manufacturer, it manufactured lenses for other mounts as well on the decade of 1980-1990
Kiron 24 mm f2 RL
Kiron 28 mm f2
Kiron 28–70 mm f4 Macro (1:4)
Kiron 105 mm f2.8 Macro (1:1)

LOMO
LOMO is a Russian photographic manufacturer, it made some lenses for the Almaz camera on K-mount, but caution must be used as the Almaz version has some differences with the standard K-mount 
Volna-10K 35 mm f1.8
Volna 50 mm f1.8, kit lens for Almaz-103 kamera.

Lester A. Dine
Lester A. Dine Kiron 105 mm f2.8 macro (52 mm filter)

Lensbaby
Lensbaby 1.0 Selective Focus Lens (2006–2008)
Lensbaby 2.0 Selective Focus Lens (2008)
Lensbaby Muse Double Glass Optic
Lensbaby Muse Plastic Optic
Lensbaby Composer
Lensbaby Scout with Fisheye Optic
Lensbaby Control Freak

Loreo
Loreo 35 mm f11-22 Shift lens (Lens-In-A-Cap)
Loreo 38 mm f11 3D (Stereo) (2006–Present)

Luxon
Luxon is a Chinese manufacturer, and there is little information available on the company or its products.
Luxon 50 mm f2.0 MC (China)

Mir

Mir-20K 20 mm f3.5 (rear filter)
Mir-47K 20 mm f2.5 (rear filter), made by VOMZ

Miranda
Miranda was a brand name used by the Dixons group in the UK, mostly for Cosina made products.
Miranda 28 mm f2.8 (49 mm filter)
Miranda 28 mm f2.8 MC (52 mm filter)
Miranda 50 mm f2 (49 mm filter)
Miranda 70–210 mm f4 Macro (52 mm filter)
Miranda 70–210 mm f4.5 Macro
Miranda 75–200 mm f4.5-5.3 Macro (52 mm filter)

Mitakon
Mitakon 80–200 mm f4.5 MC Zoom (55 mm filter)
Mitakon 28–200 mm f3.8-5.5

Makinon
Makinon lenses were made by Makina Optical in Japan.
Makinon MC Reflex 400m f6.7 Macro
Makinon MC Reflex 500 mm f8 Macro (catadioptric) (67 mm filter)
Makinon MC ZOOM 35–70 mm 1:2.8 (62 mm filter)
Makinon MC 135mm 1:2.8 (55 mm filter) not to be confused with the macro version. Superb sharpness wide open.
Makinon MC 135mm 1:2.8 (52 mm filter) (non-macro version, good sharpness, built-in hood)
Makinon MC 80-200mm f4.5 Macro (62 mm filter) Manual or Auto Part #744699
Makinon 28mm 1:2.8

Oberon
Oberon-11K 200 mm f2.8

Opteka
Opteka OPT500MIR-C 500mm f8

Ozunon

Ozunon 35 mm-75 mm F3.5-4.5

Panagor
Panagor is an alternative name for Kino lenses sold in Europe:
Panagor-E PMC Auto Zoom 28 mm-80 mm F3.5-4.5

Petri
Petri was a Japanese camera manufacturer, which tried to capitalize on the popularity of the K-mount lens base and made one camera that used the K-mount with one standard lens:
Petri 28 mm f2
Petri 40 mm f2.5 "Pancake"
Petri 50 mm f2
Petri 135 mm f2.8

Peleng
Peleng is a lens manufacturer based in Belarus, it was founded in the Soviet era and released most of its lenses for the M42 mount, but it has a K-mount lens:
Peleng 8 mm f3.5 (2008)

Pentax

Bold text indicates lenses in current production/stock sale from Pentax.

Special optics 
Pentax Stereo Adapter I
Pentax Stereo Adapter II

Teleconverters 
SMC Pentax Rear Converter K T6-2x
SMC Pentax Rear Converter-A 1.4x-L
SMC Pentax Rear Converter-A 2x-L
SMC Pentax Rear Converter-A 1.4x-S
SMC Pentax Rear Converter-A 2x-S
SMC Pentax-F 1.7x AF Adapter
HD Pentax-DA AF Rear Converter 1.4x AW (2014)

Phoenix
Phoenix 500 mm f8 Reflex (catadioptric) (2006)
Phoenix 800 mm f8 Reflex (catadioptric) (2008)

Polar
Polar is a brand of Samyang Optics, a South Korean third party lens manufacturer. 
Polar 800 mm f8 Reflex (catadioptric) (2008)
Polar 85 mm Portrait Lens f1.4 Aspherical IF (2008)

Porst 
Porst 28 mm f2.8 MC Auto
Porst 40 mm f2.5 MC Auto
Porst 55 mm f1.2 Reflex MC Auto (55 mm filter)
Porst 55 mm f1.2 MC Auto
Porst 135 mm f2.8 Tele-AS MC E (55 mm filter)
Porst 75–260 mm f4.5
Porst 200 mm f3.5

Promaster 
Promaster 18–200 mm f3.5-6.3 AF XR EDO
Promaster 18–200 mm f3.5-6.3 AF XR EDO(2007)
Promaster 19–35 mm f3.5-4.5 AF
Promaster 24–200 mm f3.5-5.6 AF XLD ASP
Promaster 28–80 mm f3.5-5.6 AF
Promaster 28–70 mm f2.8-4.2 MC Auto ZOOM MACRO
Promaster 28–70 mm f3.9-4.8 Spectrum 7 MC Macro Auto
Promaster 28–80 mm f3.5-5.6 Spectrum 7 AF
Promaster 28–105 mm f4-5.6 AF IF
Promaster 28–200 mm f3.5-5.6 AF XR
Promaster 28–210 mm f3.5-5.6 Spectrum 7 MC Macro
Promaster 50 f1.7
Promaster 60–300 mm f4-5.6 Spectrum 7 (67 mm filter) (2008)
Promaster 70–210 mm f4-5.6 AF Macro
Promaster 70–300 mm f4-5.6 Spectrum 7 AF EDO LD Macro (2007)
Promaster 80–200 mm f3.5 MC (62 mm filter)
Promaster 80–210 mm f4.5-5.6 AF
Promaster 85–210 mm f3.8 Auto Zoom Macro MC
Promaster 135 mm f1:2.8 MC

Quantaray
Quantaray AF 100–300 mm f/4.5-6.7 LDO

Revue
Revue 35 mm f2.8
Revue 80–200 mm f4.5
Revue 28–70 mm f3.5-4.5
Revue 28–50 mm f3.5-4.5
Revue 70–210 mm f4.5 AF

Revu
Revu 50 mm f1.2 (1975)

Revuenon
 Revuenon Auto multicoated 28 mm f/2.8
 Revuenon Auto MC 28 mm f/2.8
 Revuenon Auto MC 55 mm f/1.4
 Revuenon Auto MC 55 mm f/1.7
 Revuenon 55 mm f/1.2
 Revuenon 135 mm f/2.8
 Revuenon Auto MC 135 mm f/2.8
 Revuenon 200 mm f/3.3
 Revuenon 200 mm f/3.5
 Revuenon 300 mm f/5.6
 Revuenon 500 mm f/8.0 Mirror

Ricoh - Rikenon - Riconar
This lens uses the Ricoh KR-mount version, Ricoh made both a XR version without the zoom pin, and the P version which has it.
Rikenon 24 mm f2.8 (52 mm filter)XR Version
Rikenon 28 mm f2.8 (52 mm filter)XR Version
Rikenon 28 mm f3.5 (52 mm filter)XR Version (probably a renamed smc PENTAX-M 28mm f/3.5, very sharp wide-open)
Rikenon 35 mm f2.8 XR Version
Rikenon 50 mm f2 (52 mm filter)XR Version
Rikenon 50 mm f2 L (52 mm filter)XR Version
Rikenon 50 mm f2 S (52 mm filter)XR Version
Rikenon 50 mm f1.4 (52 mm filter)XR Version
Rikenon 50 mm f1.7 (52 mm filter)XR Version
Riconar 55 mm f2.2 (52 mm filter)
Rikenon 55 mm f1.2 (58 mm filter)XR Version
Rikenon 135 mm f2.8 (55 mm filter)XR Version
Rikenon 200 mm f4 XR
Rikenon 50 mm f2 (52 mm filter)P Version
Rikenon 600 mm f8 Reflex XR Version

Rokinon 
This lens uses the Ricoh KR-mount version:
Rokinon 500 mm f6.3 Reflex (catadioptric)

Sakar
Sakar is a commercial American company that used to sell K-mount lenses.
80–210 mm f1:3.8 macro MC (58 mm filter)
85–210 mm f1:4.5 macro MC
500 mm f/8 macro mirror (catadioptric)

Samyang
Samyang is an optical manufacturer located in South Korea.  Many of their lenses are also sold under the Rokinon and Bower brand names.
Samyang 8 mm f/3.5 UMC Fish-eye CS II
Samyang 10 mm f/2.8 ED AS NCS CS
Samyang 12 mm f/2.8 AS NCS Fish-eye
Samyang 14 mm f/2.8 ED S IF UMC
Samyang 16 mm f/2.0 ED AS UC CS
Samyang 20 mm f/1.8 ED AS UMC
Samyang 24 mm f/1.4 ED AS IF UMC
Samyang Tilt/Shift 24 mm f/3.5 ED AS UC
Samyang 35 mm f/1.4 AS UMC
Samyang 50 mm f/1.4 AS UMC
Samyang 85 mm f/1.4 AS IF UMC
Samyang 100 mm f/2.8 ED UMC Macro
Samyang 135 mm f/2.0 ED UMC
Samyang 100–500 mm f5.6-7.1 Macro Tele Zoom Lens

Samsung
All these lenses had been marketed by Samsung and present on Samsung's GX-series DSLRs. Schneider-Kreuznach is a traditional optics maker that do still make specialised glass and lenses (today mainly high-quality large-format lenses, enlarger lens and photographic loupes), but not for Samsung. They license their name to Samsung granted that certain minimum quality requirements are fulfilled. All the Schneider branded glass from Samsung is manufactured by Pentax and corresponds directly to Pentax lenses.
Schneider-Kreuznach D-Xenogon 10–17 mm F3.5-4.5 ED (2007- ) (rebadged Pentax DA 10-17mm lens, 2006-)
Schneider-Kreuznach D-Xenon 12–24 mm f4 ED (2007- ) (rebadged Pentax DA 12-24mm lens, 2005-)
Schneider-Kreuznach D-Xenon 18–55 mm f3.5-5.6 AF (2007- ) (rebadged Pentax DA 18-55mm lens, 2004- )
Schneider-Kreuznach D-Xenogon 35 mm f2 (2006-) (rebadged Pentax FA 35mm lens, 1999-)
Schneider-Kreuznach D-Xenon 50–200 mm f/4-5.6 AF (2006-) (rebadged Pentax DA 50-200mm lens, 2005-)
Schneider-Kreuznach D-Xenon 100 mm MACRO 1:2.8 (2007-) (rebadged Pentax D FA 100mm lens, 2004-)

Schneider-Kreuznach
The Schneider-Kreuznach lenses feature shift and tilt movements for perspective control; they can be shifted by 12 mm and tilted by 8 degrees simultaneously.

 Schneider-Kreuznach PC-TS Super-Angulon 4.5/28 28mm f4.5
 Schneider-Kreuznach PC-TS Super-Angulon 2.8/50 50mm f2.8
 Schneider-Kreuznach PC-TS Makro-Symmar 4.5/90 HM 90mm f4.5

Sears
Sears is an American commercial company that sells relabeled lenses and cameras at their own stores in the United States for a number of years. As the objective was mainly commercial, quality is very different among lenses. Quality on construction in some ones is very good and in some others is plain bad. But it seems to be consistent among the same model. 
Some of the Sears lenses were made to fit Sears Cameras with the Ricoh K-mount version and are identified as KR, but is prudent to verify it before using it on more modern cameras that may be damaged by the Ricoh pin. 
Sears 28 mm f/2.8 Auto MC
Sears 50 mm f/1.4 Auto MC
Sears 50 mm f/1.7 Auto MC
Sears 50 mm f/2
Sears 50 mm f/1.7
Sears 55 mm f/1.4
Sears 55 mm f/2
Sears 28–70 mm f/3.5-4.5 Macro
Sears 60–300 mm f/4-5.6 Macro (KR-mount)
Sears 75–260 mm f/4.5 MC Macro
Sears 80–200 mm f/4-5.6 Auto MC
Sears MC 135 mm f/2.8
Sears Auto 2X Teleconverter

Sigma
Sigma is a Japanese manufacturer of cameras and lenses. It has made lenses for the K-mount for a number of years. And quality among them had varied a lot. After the launch of the K10D digital SLR it launched K-mount D series lenses. Such ones are designed to be used with the APS size camera, but older K-mount can be used as well. An increase in model numbers can be seen between 2007 and 2008 due to the success of the K10D, K100D, K100D Super, K110D, K20D and K200D cameras. Use of older Sigma lenses is possible but with caution, some Sigma older K-mount lenses are with the infamous Ricoh pin.

Sigma 8 mm f/3.5 EX DG Fisheye
Sigma 8–16 mm f/4.5-5.6 DC HSM
Sigma 10–20 mm f/4.0-5.6 AF EX DC
Sigma 10–20 mm F/3.5 EX DC HSM
Sigma 12–24 mm f/4.5-5.6 EX DG
Sigma 14 mm f/2.8 EX DG
Sigma 15 mm f/2.8 EX DG Fisheye
Sigma 15–30 mm f/3.5-5.6 AF EX DG
Sigma 17–35 mm f/2.8-4 EX ASP
Sigma 17–50 mm f/2.8 EX DC OS HSM
Sigma 17–70 mm f/2.8-4.5 DC Macro
Sigma 17–70 mm f/2.8-4.5 DC Macro (2007)
Sigma 17–70 mm f/2.8-4 DC Macro OS HSM
Sigma 18–50 mm f/3.5-5.6 DC AF
Sigma 18–50 mm f2.8-4.5 DC OS HSM
Sigma 18–125 mm f/3.8-5.6 DC HSM
Sigma 18–200 mm f/3.5-5.6 DC
Sigma 18–250 mm f/3.5-6.3 DC OS HSM
Sigma 20 mm f/1.8 EX DG ASP
Sigma 20–40 mm f/2.8 EX DG ASP
Sigma 24 mm f/1.8 EX DG
Sigma 24–70 mm f/2.8 IF EX DG HSM
Sigma 24–70 mm f/3.5-5.6
Sigma 24–135 mm f/2.8-4.5 IF ASPH AF
Sigma 28 mm f/1.8 EX DG
Sigma 28 mm Mini-Wide f/2.8
Sigma 28–70 mm f/2.8 EX DF ASP
Sigma 28–300 mm f/3.5-6.3 DL ASP IF
Sigma 28 mm f/1.8 EX DG
Sigma 28–300 mm f/3.5-6.3 CHZ ASP
Sigma 28–200 mm f/3.5-5.6 DL Macro
Sigma 28–200 mm f/3.5-5.6
Sigma 28–105 mm f/2.8-4 ASP
Sigma 28–80 mm f/2.8 EX DF ASP Macro II
Sigma 28–80 mm f/2.8 EX DF ASP Macro
Sigma 28–80 mm f/3.5-5.6
Sigma 30 mm f/1.4 EX DC
Sigma 35–70 mm f/2.8-4 Macro 1:6.7(52 mm filter)
Sigma 50 mm f1.4 EX DG HSM
Sigma 50 mm f/2.8 EX DG Macro
Sigma 50–150 mm APO f/2.8 EX DC II
Sigma 50–200 mm f4-5.6 DC O S HSM
Sigma 50–500 mm f/4-6.3 EX APO HSM
Sigma 70 mm f/2.8 EX DG Macro
Sigma 70–200 mm f/2.8 EX DG Macro
Sigma 70–200 mm f/2.8 EX APO
Sigma 70–200 mm f/2.8 EX DG OS HSM
Sigma 70–200 mm f/2.8 EX DG APO Macro MkII
Sigma 75–210 mm f/3.5-4.5 ZOOM-K III MC
Sigma 70–300 mm f/4-5.6 DG APO Macro
Sigma 70–300 mm f/4-5.6 DG Macro
Sigma 70–300 mm f/4-5.6 DG OS
Sigma 70–300 mm f/4-5.6 DI LD Macro (2008)
Sigma 70–300 mm f/4-5.6 DL Macro
Sigma 70–300 mm f/4-5.6 DG Macro
Sigma 70–300 mm f/4-5.6 EX APO Macro
Sigma 75–300 mm f4-5.6 AF
Sigma 85 mm f/1.4 EX DG HSM
Sigma 100–200 mm f/4.5 Macro
Sigma 100–300 mm f/4.5-6.7 DL
Sigma 100–300 mm f/4 EX APO IF
Sigma 100–300 mm f/4.5-6.7 DL
Sigma 105 mm f/2.8 EX DG Macro
Sigma 120–400 mm f/4.5-5.6 APO DG OS HSM
Sigma 135–400 mm f/4.5-5.6 APO ASP
Sigma 150–500 mm f/5.0-6.3 DG OS HSM
Sigma 170–500 mm f/5-6.3 APO ASP
Sigma 180 mm f/3.5 EX Macro
Sigma 300 mm f/2.8 EX DG
Sigma 500 mm f/4 XQ Reflex (catadioptric)
Sigma 500 mm f/4.5 EX DG
Sigma 500 mm f/8 Reflex (catadioptric)
Sigma 600 mm f/8 Reflex (catadioptric)

Soligor 
Soligor 70–210 mm f/4.5
Soligor MC 80/135 f/4 dualfocal
Soligor 85–205 mm f/3.8
Soligor MC 90 mm-230 mm f/4.5
Soligor 135 mm f/2.8
Soligor 200 mm f/2.8
Soligor 80/200 mm MC f/4.5
 Soligor C/D 28–200 mm f/3.8-5.5 Macro
 Soligor 35-105/3.5 Macro

Spiratone 
Spiratone was a company devoted to sell photographic accessories and manage to sell some lenses under their own brand name until it closed, very few were made for the K-mount, and none of them are known to be of good quality.
Spiratone 400 mm f6.3
Spiratone 500 mm f8 (72 mm filter)

Sun
Sun 28–80 mm f3.5-4.5 Macro (62 mm filter)
Sun 80–200 mm f4.5 Macro (55 mm filter)
Sun 85–210 mm f4.8 telephoto zoom (55 mm filter)
Sun 70–140 mm f3.8 auto zoom (49 mm filter)

Sunagor
Sunagor 75–300 mm F5.6

Suntop
Suntop 28–135 mm f3.8-5.2 MC (67 mm filter)

Takumar

Takumar 135 mm f2.5 prime
Takumar A 28–80 mm f3.5-4.5 Macro

Tamron

Tamron is a third party vendor of photographic lenses, quality among them varies a lot. It is important to distinguish the adaptall versions from everything else, the adaptall is a generic adapter that allowed Tamron to manufacture a single lens design for a wide range of cameras, and commercialize those for specific brands with the use of the Adaptall I and Adaptall II adapters. So there are Tamron Lenses on K-mount, and Tamron Adaptall I and II for K- and KA-mount adapters. More Information on the Adaptall can be found on the Tamron article of Wikipedia. Here the non-Adaptall versions:

Tamron 10–24 mm f/3.5-4.5 Di II LD AF SP Aspherical (IF)
Tamron 17–50 mm f/2.8 SP AF XR Di-II LD Aspherical IF
Tamron 18–250 mm f/3.5-6.3 AF Di-II LD Aspherical IF Macro
Tamron 18–200 mm f/3.5-6.3 XR Di-II LD IF (2008)
Tamron 24 mm f/2.5 (Adaptall 2, two versions (01BB) and (01B)
Tamron 28–75 mm f/2.8 SP AF XR Di LD Aspherical IF Macro
Tamron 28–80 mm f/3.5-5.6 AF
Tamron 28–300 mm f/3.5-6.3 XR DI LD
Tamron 70–200 mm f/2.8 SP AF
Tamron 70–300 mm f/4-5.6 DI LD Macro (2008)
Tamron 80–250 mm f/3.8-4.5 Macro (Adaptall) (QZ-825M/QZ-250M)
Tamron 90 mm f/2.8 SP Di Macro (No Adaptall version)
Tamron 90 mm f/2.5 Macro (Adaptall)
Tamron 90 mm f/2.8 SP AFDi 1:1 Macro
Tamron 300 mm f/2.8 DL (Adaptall)
Tamron 500 mm f/8 SP (Adaptall 2) Reflex (catadioptric)

Tokina
Tokina 17 mm f3.5
Tokina 28 mm f2.8
Tokina 90 mm f2.5 macro AT-X
Tokina 90 mm f2.8 macro
Tokina 200 mm f3.5
Tokina 20–35 mm f2.8 AT-X Pro
Tokina 28–70 mm f/2.6-2.8 AT-X Pro
Tokina 28–70 mm f2.8
Tokina 28–70 mm f3.5-4.5 PKA-mount
Tokina 28–200 mm f3.5-5.3 zoom, 72 mm filter
Tokina 35–70 mm f3.5-4.6 SZ-X - close focusing zoom and macro
Tokina 35–105 mm f3.5 RMC - close focusing zoom
Tokina 60–120 mm f2.8 AT-X (portrait lens, 55 mm filter)
Tokina 70–210 mm f4.0-5.6 (manual + AF, AF lens was also made for Vivitar)
Tokina 70–210 mm f4.5
Tokina 75–150 mm f3.8
Tokina 80–200 mm f2.8
Tokina 80–200 mm f4.5-5.6 SZ-X (49 mm filter)
Tokina 80–400 mm f4.5-5.6 AT-X
Tokina 150–500 mm f5.6 AT-X SD
Tokina 500 mm f8 RMC Reflex (catadioptric)

Tou/Five Star 
Tou Five Star was the commercial brand from Toyo Optics; some lenses are labeled as Toyo Optics, Toyo Five Star or Tou Five Star. They were manufactured between 1967 and sometime around 1980, when the company seems to have changed its focus to video lenses.
Tou/Five Star MC Auto 28 mm 1:2.8 (to f/22) (52 mm)
Toyo/Five Star MC Auto 28 mm 1:2.8 (to f/16) (52 mm)
Tou/Five Star 28–80 mm 1:3.5-4.5 macro
Tou/Five Star 28–135 mm 1:3.5-5.2 macro (67 mm)
Tou/Five Star MC Auto 35–75 mm 1:3.5-4.8 macro (55 mm)
Tou/Five Star 70–210 mm 1:4.5-22 macro (55 mm)
Tou/Five Star 75–200 mm 1:4.5 macro
Tou/Five Star MC Auto 200 mm 1:4.5 (52 mm)
Tou/Five Star 500 mm 1:8

Venus Optics
Laowa 12 mm f/2.8 Zero-D
Laowa 15 mm f4 Wide Angle Macro
Laowa 25 mm f/2.8 2.5-5X Ultra Macro
Laowa 60 mm f2.8 2X Ultra-Macro
Laowa 105 mm f/2 Smooth Trans Focus (STF)

Vivitar
Vivitar 17 mm f3.5 MC Wide-Angle
Vivitar 19–35 mm f3.5-4.5 Series 1
Vivitar 24 mm f2
Vivitar 24 mm f2.8
Vivitar 24–70 mm f3.3-4.8 Series 1
Vivitar 28 mm f2
Vivitar 28 mm f2.5
Vivitar 28 mm f2.8
Vivitar 28–85 mm f2.8-3.8
Vivitar 28–90 mm f2.8-3.5 Series 1
Vivitar 28–105 mm f2.8-3.8 Series 1
Vivitar 35–200 mm f3-4.5 Macro 1:5 (65 mm filter)
Vivitar 35 mm f2.8 VMC (49 mm filter)
Vivitar 40 mm f2.5 VMC
Vivitar 50 mm f1.4 VMC
Vivitar 50 mm f2 (49 mm filter)
Vivitar 55 mm f1.2 VMC Series I (58 mm filter)
Vivitar 70–210 mm f3.5 Macro Zoom Series 1 & f2.8-4 Series 1
Vivitar 75–200 mm f4.5
Vivitar 85–205 mm f3.8
Vivitar 90 mm f2.5 SL I Macro (2002-?)
Vivitar 90–180 mm f4.5 Macro
Vivitar 100–500 mm f5.6-8 (67 mm filter) Series 1
Vivitar 105 mm f2.5 Macro Series 1
Vivitar 135 mm f2.3 Series 1
Vivitar 135 mm f2.8
Vivitar 135 mm f3.5 VMC (49 mm filter)
Vivitar 200 mm f3 Series 1 (72 mm filter)
Vivitar 450 mm f4.5 Series 1 aspherical catadioptric
Vivitar 600 mm f8 Series 1 solid catadioptric
Vivitar 800 mm f11 Series 1 solid catadioptric

Cosina Voigtländer
Cosina Voigtländer Color Skopar 20 mm f3.5 SL-II (2009)
Cosina Voigtländer 35–70 mm f3.5-4.8 (2004)
Cosina Voigtländer Ultron Aspherical 40 mm f2 SL-II (2008, limited)
Cosina Voigtländer Ultron Aspherical 40 mm f2 SL (2007, limited)
Cosina Voigtländer Nokton 58 mm f1.4 (2008)
Cosina Voigtländer Nokton 58 mm f1.4 SL-II (2008, SL never available for K-mount)
Cosina Voigtländer Color-Heliar 75 mm f2.5 (2002-200?)
Cosina Voigtländer Apo-Lanthar 90 mm f3.5 SL
Cosina Voigtländer Apo-Lanthar 125 mm f2.5 SL (2002–2006)
Cosina Voigtländer Apo-Lanthar 180 mm f4 SL (2002–2006)

VOMZ
Vologda Optical-and-Mechanical Plant.
Mir-47K 20 mm f2.5
Oberon-11K 200 mm f2.8

Zenitar

Zenitar is a Russian lens brand, made by KMZ. Most Zenitar lenses are also available in M42-mount. Some of these are sold as K-mount lenses but use an adapter.
MC Zenitar-K 16 mm f2.8
MC Zenitar-K 1:2.8 20 mm
MC Zenitar-K 1:2.8 28 mm
MC Zenitar-К 1:1.4 50 mm
MC Zenitar-K 1:1.9 50 mm
MC Zenitar-K2 50 mm f2 (1995-?)
MC Zenitar-1K 1:1.4 85 mm telephoto
MC APO Telezenitar-K 1:2.8 135 mm telephoto
MC APO Telezenitar-K 300 mm f4.5 (2008) telephoto
MC Variozenitar-K 25–45 mm f2.8-3.5 (1980-? version)(60 mm filter) zoom
MC Variozenitar-K 25–45 mm f2.8-3.5 (2008) zoom
MC Variozenitar-K 35–100 mm f2.8 (1980?) zoom
MC Variozenitar-K 1:3.5-4.5 35–105 mm zoom
MC Variozenitar-K 1:4.0 70–210 mm zoom

Special lenses 

Zenitar MC 35 mm Tilt & Shift f2.8 (2008)
Zenitar MC 80 mm Tilt & Shift f2.8 (2008)

References

External links

The Evolution of the Pentax K-mount, PentaxForums
Pentax K-mount page, KMP (former Bojidar Dimitrov)
Pentax K Lens Database, Aperturepedia. A comprehensive table with detailed information on all first-party Pentax K-mount lenses
Pentax K-Mount Lenses Explained, Mosphotos.com
Pentax Lens Compatibility Chart, Mosphotos.com
Pentax Lens Review Database and Third-Party PK-mount Lens Review Database, PentaxForums
The Pentax Lens Gallery: List of some film-era Pentax K lenses and some comparison on bokeh and flare, also selected non-Pentax ones
Pentax DSLR lenses catalog, Pentax UK
The PENTAX optical system - Magical moments captured in detail and clarity, archived Pentax lens product page
Stan's Pentax Photography, Stan Halpin

Lens mounts
 
K-mount
Japanese inventions